State Route 85 (SR 85) is a  state highway in the southeastern part of the U.S. state of Alabama. The southern terminus of the highway is at an intersection with SR 27 in Geneva. The highway continues to its northern terminus at an entrance to Fort Rucker near Daleville.

Route description
SR 85 heads northeasterly from its southern terminus in Geneva. The highway travels through rural areas of Geneva County, then crosses into the southwestern corner of Dale County. Near Clayhatchee, the highway briefly turns eastward as it begins a brief concurrency with SR 92. The highway turns northward at the end of the concurrency, then continues through Daleville, where it crosses U.S. Route 84 (US 84) then reaches its northern terminus at a gate on the south side of Fort Rucker.

Major intersections

References

085
Transportation in Geneva County, Alabama
Transportation in Dale County, Alabama